Abram Claude (December 4, 1818 – January 10, 1901) was 4-time mayor of Annapolis, Maryland (1849–1851, 1854–1855, 1867–1869, 1883–1889). He was the son of 2-time mayor of Annapolis Dennis Claude.

References

External links
Abram Claude, MSA SC 3520-13688 - Maryland State Archives. msa.maryland.gov/megafile/msa/speccol/sc3500/.../13688bio.html

1818 births
1901 deaths
Mayors of Annapolis, Maryland
St. John's College (Annapolis/Santa Fe) faculty
University of Maryland School of Medicine alumni